Caspali is a surname. Notable people with this surname include:

 Elijah Capsali ( 1485 – after 1550), Ottoman rabbi and historian
 Floria Capsali (1900–1982), Ottoman-born Romanian ballerina, choreographer, and dance teacher
 Moses Capsali (1420–1495), Venetian-born Jewish rabbi in the Ottoman Empire